Peter Brennan (born June 30, 1942) is an American bobsledder. He competed in the four man event at the 1976 Winter Olympics.

References

1942 births
Living people
American male bobsledders
Olympic bobsledders of the United States
Bobsledders at the 1976 Winter Olympics
Sportspeople from Newburgh, New York